Maximilian Abel (born 28 February 1982) is a professional tennis player from Germany. In 2008, Abel received a two-year suspension by the International Tennis Federation, for testing positive for cocaine.

Junior career
Abel was runner-up to Andy Roddick at the 1999 Orange Bowl, in the 18 and under category. En route to the final he had wins over Feliciano López and Mardy Fish.

Professional career
Abel reached the final of the Campos do Jordão Challenger tournament in 2002, which he lost to Ricardo Mello.

He lost to Bohdan Ulihrach in four sets at the 2003 US Open, which would be his only Grand Slam main draw appearance.

In 2003 he advanced to the second round of the Dubai Tennis Championships, where he lost to Roger Federer, and the MercedesCup, where he defeated Antony Dupuis before being eliminated by Rainer Schüttler.

Controversy
In April 2008, Abel received a two-year suspension by the International Tennis Federation, for testing positive for a metabolite of cocaine. The sample had come from the 2007 Open de Moselle, where Abel participated in the qualifying rounds.

Abel was arrested in 2008 and in March 2009 was sentenced to three years in prison, convicted of credit card fraud.

Comeback
In September 2012, Abel made his comeback at a Challenger tournament in Istanbul.

References

1982 births
Living people
German male tennis players
Doping cases in tennis
German sportspeople in doping cases
Criminals from Hesse
Tennis players from Frankfurt